Bruno is a 1988 Filipino action film directed by Jun Raquiza and starring Max Laurel as the titular character, alongside Ken Snell, Jane Castellvi, and Vicky Roa. It was released in early April 1988. Luciano E. Soriano of the Manila Standard gave the film a negative review, criticizing it as a trite entry to the vigilante film genre with forgettable performances, though he commended its bleak cinematography.

Plot
Bruno is a former soldier trained to kill enemies with his bare hands. After his brother and sister die in the hands of a crime syndicate, Bruno takes it upon himself to avenge their deaths.

Cast
Max Laurel as Bruno
Ken Snell as Jobo, head of the syndicate
Jane Castellvi as Jona, Bruno's sister
Vicky Roa as Bultre
Dan Corbe

Critical response
Luciano E. Soriano, writing for the Manila Standard, gave Bruno a negative review, stating that it is simply "another rehash of the popular vigilante genre". He considered Max Laurel to have too limited acting skills to carry a film by himself, unlike his titular villain role in the Zuma films where he was aided by make-up and special effects, and expressed that the decision to cast unknowns for the film led to forgettable characters. Soriano noted, however, that the film's best aspect is its bleak cinematography, which generates a suitable atmosphere for the film.

References

External links

1988 films
1988 action films
Filipino-language films
Philippine vigilante films